

References

West Sussex
Sports venues in West Sussex
Parks and open spaces in West Sussex
Lists of buildings and structures in West Sussex